The 2019 Southland Conference tournament was held at Lady Demon Diamond on the campus of Northwestern State University in Natchitoches, Louisiana, from May 7 through 10, 2019. The tournament winner, Sam Houston State, earned the Southland Conference's automatic bid to the 2019 NCAA Division I softball tournament. The Championship game was broadcast on ESPNU. The remainder of the tournament aired on the Southland Digital Network.

Format
The 2019 tournament marked the second year with expanded format including the top 8 teams following Abilene Christian and Incarnate Word's eligibility for the tournament.  The first two games were single elimination while the rest of the tournament was a double elimination format.

Tournament

New Orleans does not sponsor a softball team.

Awards and honors
Source:  

Tournament MVP: Lindsey McCleod, Sam Houston State

All-Tournament Teams:

 Cayla Jones, Northwestern State
 Justyce McClain, McNeese State
 Margarita Corona, Stephen F. Austin
 Kassidy Wilbur, Stephen F. Austin
 Kali Clement, Nicholls
 Kasey Frederick, Nicholls
 Caitlin Garcia, Nicholls
 Meegan Landry, Nicholls
 Tiffany Thompson, Sam Houston State
 Brooke Malia, Sam Houston State
 Bailey White, Sam Houston State
 Lindsey McCleod, Sam Houston State (MVP)

See also
2019 Southland Conference baseball tournament

References

Southland Conference softball tournament
Tournament
2019 Southland Conference softball season